Bandari Raji Reddy is an Indian politician. In 2009 he was elected as the Member of the Legislative Assembly for Uppal constituency in Andhra Pradesh, India. He is a member of the Indian National Congress party.

Career
He was the chairman of Kapra municipality.

References

Indian National Congress politicians from Andhra Pradesh
Andhra Pradesh MLAs 2009–2014
Living people
Year of birth missing (living people)